Ekeren is a railway station in the town of Ekeren, Antwerp, Belgium. The station opened on 3 July 1854 on the Antwerp–Lage Zwaluwe railway, known in Belgium as Line 12.

Train services
The station is served by the following services:

Intercity services (IC-22) Essen - Antwerp - Mechelen - Brussels (weekdays)
Local services (L-22) Roosendaal - Essen - Antwerp - Puurs (weekdays)
Local services (L-22) Roosendaal - Essen - Antwerp (weekends)

Bus service 
Bus line 730 serves the station, it is operated by De Lijn.

External links
Belgian Railways website

Railway stations opened in 1854
Railway stations in Belgium
Railway stations in Antwerp Province
1854 establishments in Belgium